If You Want Loyalty Buy a Dog is the seventh album by Little Axe, released on October 24, 2011 by On-U Sound. It was the first album Skip McDonald produced without the aid of fellow Tackhead members Keith LeBlanc and Doug Wimbish.

Track listing

Personnel 

Musicians
Alan Glen – harmonica
Skip McDonald – vocals, guitar, keyboards, producer, bass guitar (2, 7)
George Oban – bass guitar (1, 6, 8, 9, 11, 12)
Style Scott – drums
Additional personnel
Steve Barker – spoken word
Dub Syndicate – backup band (4, 5, 10, 13)
Madeline Edgehill – vocals (7)
The Roots Radics – backup band (3, 14)
Valerie Skeete – vocals (7)

Technical personnel
Lincoln "Style" Scott – co-producer
Adrian Sherwood – producer

Release history

References

External links 
 

2011 albums
Albums produced by Adrian Sherwood
Little Axe albums
On-U Sound Records albums